2000 Rugby League World Cup qualification Pool A is one of the two groups in the 2000 Rugby League World Cup qualifying. The group comprises the Mediterranean nations Lebanon, Italy and Morocco.

Standings

References

2000 Rugby League World Cup